Strange Journey Volume Two is the fourth mixtape by Southern hip-hop group CunninLynguists, released on November 3, 2009. The album features guest appearances from E-40, Sean Price, Witchdoctor, Evidence, Geologic of Blue Scholars and Tonedeff, among others. The production is mostly handled by Kno, with contributions from Blue Sky Black Death and J-Zone. Strange Journey Volume Two followed the July 2009 release of Strange Journey Volume One.

Release 
In advance of the album's release, the song "Running Wild", featuring E-40, was released for free on the QN5 website on October 13, 2009. A week later, "The WWKYA Tour" remix, featuring Extended Famm, was also released for free on the label's website. 8 days later, the label released yet another free download on its site, "To Be for Real". A deluxe version of the mixtape is available, which contains an instrumental version of the album.

Track listing
All tracks are produced by Kno except where noted.

References 

CunninLynguists albums
2009 mixtape albums
Hip hop compilation albums
Albums produced by J-Zone
Sequel albums